Kadakkavoor railway station (Code: KVU) is a NSG 6 D category railway station in Thiruvananthapuram District, Kerala and falls under the Thiruvananthapuram railway division of the Southern Railway zone, Indian Railways. It is situated in Kadakkavur panchayat of Trivandrum district. Kadakkavur is the 8th most revenue generating railway station in Trivandrum district.

Trains passing through Kadakkavur 

Railway stations in Thiruvananthapuram district
Thiruvananthapuram railway division
Railway stations opened in 1904